Gunnar Olof Björling, (31 May 1887 – 11 July 1960) was a Swedish-speaking Finnish poet. He was one of the leading figures of Finnish-Swedish modernist literature, along with Elmer Diktonius, Edith Södergran and Hagar Olsson.

Biography

Björling was born in Helsinki. He spent his childhood in Helsinki and Viipuri, and the summer months in Kangasala. Between 1901 and 1902 he attended Hamina Cadet School, and then studied philosophy at the University of Helsinki. One of his teachers was the internationally renowned sociologist Edvard Westermarck, who greatly influenced Björling's thinking. During his school years in Helsinki, Björling became a passionate socialist, was active in the trade unions and participated in several minor operations. However, when the Finnish Civil War broke out in 1918, Björling supported the whites, and helped a telegraphist working for the whites by hiding him in his basement. After the war, Björling participated in one of the courts which sentenced captured reds. Later in life, however, he renounced and distanced himself from his activities during and after the war.

Björling's debut as a poet came in 1922, when he was 35 years old, with Vilande dag, which consists of prose poems and aphorisms, some of them one-liners. Between 1928 and 1929, he contributed to the Swedish-language modernist publication Quosego. Although Björling is principally considered a modernist poet, he also experimented with dadaism, and was sometimes called "Europe's last dadaist".

Björling was openly bisexual in an era when it was broadly seen as a social deviation. The psychoanalyst Mikael Enckell, son of fellow Finnish modernist writer Rabbe Enckell, made the following analysis of Björling's sexuality: "It is not enough that he apparently was bisexual in a time and in a generation when this was socially stigmatizing in a way we can imagine only with difficulty. He himself hardly wholeheartedly affirmed his bisexuality, it was connected with notions of deep shame, moral inferiority and deviation."

Björling died in Helsinki in 1960.

Bibliography
Vilande dag, 1922
Korset och löftet, 1925
Kiri-ra!, 1930
Solgrönt, 1933
Fågel badar snart i vatten, 1934
Att syndens blåa nagel, 1936
Där jag vet att du, 1938
Det oomvända anletet, 1939
Angelägenheten, 1940
Ohjälpligheten, 1943
O finns en dag, 1944
Ord och att ej annat, 1945
Luft är och ljus, 1946
Ohört blott, 1948
Vårt kattliv timmar, 1949
Ett blyertsstreck, 1951
Som alla dar, 1953
Att i sitt öga, 1954
Du går de ord, 1955

References

Further reading 

 
 

1887 births
1960 deaths
Writers from Helsinki
Swedish-speaking Finns
Finnish poets in Swedish
Swedish-language poets
Finnish LGBT poets
20th-century Finnish people
20th-century Finnish poets